Basket Croix Rousse Olympique Lyon is a French basketball club playing in 2016 at the Regional level male 2 Division. It is based in the city of Lyon.

History 
CRO Lyon experienced in elite (National 1A) of the championship of France in the 1970s and the early 1990s but stopped its activities (budget problems in 1996) before returning to lower levels. The club return to the top flight was possible thanks to financial support from Roger Caille, CEO of Jet Service, the club then called Dumb  Lyon.

Honours 
French League 2
 Winners (2): 1982–83, 1990–91
French U20 League
 Winners: 2015–16
 Finalists: 2016–17

Notable players 
  Éric Beugnot
  Richard Dacoury
  Franck Mériguet
  Régis Racine
  Stéphane Risacher
  Jimmy Vérove
  Michael Young
  Christophe Soulé
  James Nallbani

Head coaches 
  Maurice Buffière (1974–77)
  Jean-Michel Sénégal (1989–94)
  Brigitte Coste (2006–07)
  Johan Rat (2009–10)
  Jean-Luc Réocreux (2010–12)
  Johan Rat (2012–2014)

References

External links 
 Official site 

Basketball teams in France
Sport in Lyon